High-altitude cooking is cooking done at altitudes that are considerably higher than sea level. At elevated altitudes, any cooking that involves boiling or steaming generally requires compensation for lower temperatures because the boiling point of water is lower at higher altitudes due to the decreased atmospheric pressure. Means of compensation include extending cooking times or using a pressure cooker to provide higher pressure inside the cooking vessel and hence higher temperatures.

Boiling

For every  increase in elevation, water's boiling point is lowered by approximately 0.5 °C. At  in elevation, water boils at just . Boiling as a cooking method must be adjusted or alternatives applied. Vegetables and some starches will simply take longer to cook, while rice and legumes (beans) usually require a pressure cooker. Pasta will also require a pressure cooker.

Methods used at high altitudes 

A pressure cooker is often used to compensate for the low atmospheric pressure at very high elevations. Under these circumstances, water boils at temperatures significantly below 100 °c and, without the use of a pressure cooker, may leave boiled foods undercooked. Charles Darwin commented on this phenomenon in The Voyage of the Beagle:

Boiling point of pure water at elevated altitudes

Based on standard sea-level atmospheric pressure (courtesy, NOAA):

Source: NASA.

References

External links

Is it true that you can't make a decent cup of tea up a mountain? physics.org, accessed 2012-11-02

Cooking techniques